Rama Lake is a lake located near Astore in Gilgit−Baltistan, Pakistan. It is situated within the Astore Valley, which has a light covering of oak trees and other greenery. , the region has been greatly affected by the loss of forest cover, low average rainfall and low vegetation, due in part to widespread illegal logging practices in the valley.

Location 
On the way to Rama Lake, from Astore Valley, there are three small lakes called Sarot in the local Shina language.

Before 2005, Astore was a Tehsil of District Diamir, the 5th District of Gilgit−Baltistan.  Now Astore has been upgraded to a District.

There are more than 50 small villages surrounding the area in Astore, such as Chilm, Bubin, Gorikot, Eid Ghah, Fena, Bulen, Choungrah, and Parishing.

Rama Valley 
Rama Valley is thickly forested with huge pine, cedar, fir and juniper trees. The valley is about 3300 meters (10800 feet) above sea level and thus is snow covered for 7–8 months of the year. In summer, it becomes lush green; conditions favored by local shepherds.

From here one can trek to east side of the Nanga Parbat, the world's 9th highest mountain.

Accessibility 

Lake Rama is near Astore village. On KKH after passing the exit for Fairy Meadows keep driving for about another 20 minutes. When you come across the sign for Astore turn right there, keep going for another 2–3 hours. You will arrive at the village of Astore. The valley is popular for camping in the summers. Road towards Rama meadow has now been cemented and tourists can reach there without undue difficulty, however there is an hour and half trek to Rama Lake.
Location	Edit
On the way to Rama Lake, from Astore Valley, there are three small lakes called Sarot in the local Shina language.

Before 2005, Astore was a Tehsil of District Diamir, the 5th District of Gilgit−Baltistan. Now Astore has been upgraded to a District.

There are more than 50 small villages surrounding the area in Astore, such as Chilm, Bubin, Gorikot, Eid Ghah, Fena, Bulen,

Demographics 
Rama Lake is Located in Choungrah and the people of Choungrah are called Choungroch.

See also 
 Rama

References

External links 

Lakes of Gilgit-Baltistan
Astore District